Stephen James Foley (born November 11, 1953 in New Orleans, Louisiana) is a former American football safety in the National Football League. He played his entire 11-year NFL career (1976–1986) with the Denver Broncos after one year (1975) with the Jacksonville Express of the World Football League.

As a member of the Orange Crush Defense, Foley played in the Super Bowl twice. He was a starter in Super Bowl XII against the Dallas Cowboys and played in Super Bowl XXI (his final game) against the New York Giants. The Broncos lost both of these games.

Foley scored two touchdowns in his career, both of which came in 1984. He returned a fumble 22 yards on October 15 against the Green Bay Packers and an interception 40 yards on December 15 against the Seattle Seahawks. These scores were key contributions to Broncos' victories. , his 44 career interceptions remains a franchise record.

Foley began his career as a quarterback, playing high school football at Jesuit High School of New Orleans and collegiately at Tulane University, before successfully converting to defensive back.

Foley's daughter, Natalie, was a gymnast at Stanford University from 2003 to 2006.

External links
NFL.com player page

1953 births
Living people
Players of American football from New Orleans
American football safeties
American football cornerbacks
American football quarterbacks
Tulane Green Wave football players
Jacksonville Express players
Denver Broncos players